Burnout is a 2017 Moroccan drama film directed by Nour-Eddine Lakhmari. It was selected as the Moroccan entry for the Best Foreign Language Film at the 91st Academy Awards, but it was not nominated.

Cast
 Morjana Alaoui as Ines
 Sarah Perles as Aida
 Anas El Baz as Jad
 Ilyass Eljihani as Ayoub
 Driss Roukhe as Mr. Faridi
 Saadia Ladib as Rabia
 Fatima ezzahra El Jaouhari as Soumaya
 Mohamed Khiyari as Ronda

See also
 List of submissions to the 91st Academy Awards for Best Foreign Language Film
 List of Moroccan submissions for the Academy Award for Best Foreign Language Film

References

External links
 

2017 films
2017 drama films
Moroccan drama films
2010s Arabic-language films